Brenthia yaeyamae is a species of moth of the family Choreutidae. It was described by Yutaka Arita in 1971. It is found in Japan (the Ryukyu Islands) and Taiwan.

References

Brenthia
Moths described in 1971
Moths of Japan